Hypericum myrtifolium, the myrtleleaf St. Johnswort, is a species of flowering plant in the St. John's wort family, Hypericaceae. It is endemic to the Southeastern United States. It was first described by Jean-Baptiste Lamarck in 1797.

Description
The stems are glaucous and green when young, becoming reddish brown with greyish bark, corky, or peeling in strips as it ages. The branching flowerheads produce 7–30 flowers in a dichasium arrangement. It flowers in the late spring to summer (May–July). The ovary is three- or four- parted, separating at the top as it ripens, producing blackish-brown seeds.

Hypericum myrtifolium is distinguished from the similar H. frondosum by its shorter, usually clasping leaves, its broadly branching dichasial flowerheads, and its persistent sepals.

Distribution and habitat
Hypericum myrtifolium occurs in wet pine flatwoods, graminoid bogs, roadside ditches, and other wetland areas with sandy or peaty soils. It is endemic to the coastal plain in the Southeastern United States, found in most of Florida and parts of South Carolina, Georgia, Alabama, and Mississippi.

References

myrtifolium
Plants described in 1797
Flora of Alabama
Flora of Florida
Flora of Georgia (U.S. state)
Flora of South Carolina
Flora of Mississippi
Taxa named by Jean-Baptiste Lamarck